Andrew John Coltart (born 12 May 1970) is a Scottish professional golfer and TV commentator. He had a successful amateur career and played in the 1991 Walker Cup. As a professional he won twice on the European Tour, the 1998 Qatar Masters and the 2001 Great North Open, and played in the 1999 Ryder Cup.

Junior and amateur
Coltart was born in Dumfries. As an amateur, he won the 1987 Scottish Boys Championship. In 1989 he won the Standard Life Amateur Champion Gold Medal with a 4 under total of 280. He won the 1991 Scottish Amateur Stroke Play Championship and participated in the 1991 Walker Cup.

Professional
Coltart turned professional in 1991 and has been a member of the European Tour since 1993. His first professional win came at the Scottish Professional Championship in 1994, which was a non sanctioned event. He has two wins on the main European Tour, the 1998 Qatar Masters and the 2001 Great North Open. In 1995 he was a member of the winning Scottish team in the Alfred Dunhill Cup. He also won the Australian PGA Championship in 1994 and 1997. He won the PGA Tour of Australasia's Order of Merit in 1997/8.

Coltart's best finishes on the European Tour Order of Merit are seventh place in 1996 and ninth place in 1998. He was a member of the European 1999 Ryder Cup team playing in the singles against Tiger Woods.

Off the course
Since 2011, Coltart has been part of the Sky Sports commentary team, covering golf around the world.

His sister Laurae married fellow professional golfer Lee Westwood in January 1999.

Coltart is a fan of Dumfries football club Queen of the South and has been interviewed for the club's website as a fan.

Amateur wins
1987 Scottish Boys Amateur Championship
1991 Scottish Amateur Stroke Play Championship

Professional wins (5)

European Tour wins (2)

European Tour playoff record (0–1)

PGA Tour of Australasia wins (2)

PGA Tour of Australasia playoff record (0–1)

Other wins (1)

Results in major championships

Note: Coltart never played in the Masters Tournament.

CUT = missed the half-way cut
"T" = tied

Results in World Golf Championships

1Cancelled due to 9/11

QF, R16, R32, R64 = Round in which player lost in match play
"T" = Tied
NT = No tournament

Team appearances
Amateur
Jacques Léglise Trophy (representing Great Britain & Ireland): 1987 (winners)
European Boys' Team Championship (representing Scotland): 1987 (winners), 1988
European Amateur Team Championship (representing Scotland): 1989, 1991
European Youths' Team Championship (representing Scotland): 1990
Eisenhower Trophy (representing Great Britain & Ireland): 1990
St Andrews Trophy (representing Great Britain & Ireland): 1990 (winners)
Walker Cup (representing Great Britain & Ireland): 1991

Professional
Alfred Dunhill Cup (representing Scotland): 1994, 1995 (winners), 1996, 1998, 2000
World Cup (representing Scotland): 1994, 1995, 1996, 1998, 2001
Ryder Cup (representing Europe): 1999

See also
2008 European Tour Qualifying School graduates
2009 European Tour Qualifying School graduates

References

External links

Andrew Coltart interview on www.qosfc.com

Scottish male golfers
European Tour golfers
Ryder Cup competitors for Europe
Sportspeople from Dumfries
1970 births
Living people